Debbie Szostecki (born April 18, 1959) is a retired professional wrestler better known as Debbie Combs.

Early life
Her mother, Cora Combs, was also a professional wrestler. Debbie Combs made her wrestling debut at Louisville Gardens for Angelo Poffo's International Championship Wrestling (ICW) at the age of 16 in a seven-women battle royal where she was the first eliminated. Combs dated Randy Savage for five years while they were both working for ICW.

Career

World Wrestling Federation and National Wrestling Alliance
Combs worked for the World Wrestling Federation from 1986–1987, where she challenged for the WWF Women's Championship against The Fabulous Moolah and Sherri Martel.

She also worked in the National Wrestling Alliance (NWA) and is a former NWA World Women's Champion. She originally won the title by winning a battle royal in Honolulu, Hawaii in spring 1986. At some point, she was no longer recognized as the champion and defeated Penny Mitchell to become the champion again in Kansas City, Missouri on April 10, 1987. The Kansas City promotion withdrew from NWA in 1987 and closed in 1988. The NWA vacated Combs' title and awarded Misty Blue Simmes the reinstated NWA United States Women's Championship (a replacement of the prior NWA World Women's Championship held by Combs). Combs challenged Simmes to a title match at a Delta Tiger Lilies card in 1989, but Simmes was unable to accept due to an arm injury she had sustained.

American Wrestling Association
She also competed in the American Wrestling Association (AWA) in the 1980s. Upon joining the promotion, Combs wrestled against Sherri Martel as a babyface, but later turned heel and became tag team partners with Madusa Miceli. The duo feuded with Heidi Lee Morgan and Brandi Mae.

Return to WWF and World Championship Wrestling
After leaving the promotion, she later returned to the WWF in 1994 to challenge Alundra Blayze. She wrestled Blayze once on an episode of Wrestling Challenge and was scheduled to face her at WrestleMania X, but was replaced by Leilani Kai.

Combs briefly competed in World Championship Wrestling (WCW) in the mid-1990s during their brief attempt at a women's division. On the March 31, 1997 edition of WCW Monday Nitro, Combs lost to WCW Women's Champion Akira Hokuto.

Women's Pro Wrestling
In the early 1990s, she was also president and booker of Women's Pro Wrestling (WPW), an all-women's promotion that produced direct-to-video matches. Her organization featured "Awesome" Ondi Austin, Babyface Nellie, Bambi, Candi Devine, Denise Storm, Jackie Moore, Lady Justice, Lisa Starr, Malia Hosaka, Olympia Hartauer, Peggy Lee Leather, Penelope Paradise, Penny Mitchell, Sandy Partelow, Susan Green, and Velvet McIntyre.

After Wrestling
Since her retirement, Debbie Combs has worked as a booking processor with the Davidson County Sheriff's Office in Nashville, TN.

Championships and accomplishments
American Wrestling Federation
AWF Women's Championship (1 time)
Cauliflower Alley Club
Other honoree (1992)
International Wrestling Association
IWA Women's Championship (3 times)
NWA Central States Wrestling
NWA World Women's Championship (1 time)
Music City Wrestling
MCW Women's Championship (1 time)
North American All-Star Wrestling
NAASW Women's Championship (1 time)
Peach State Wrestling
NWA World Women's Championship (1 time)
Professional Wrestling Hall of Fame and Museum
Class of 2020
Southern States Wrestling
NWA World Women's Championship (1 time)
St. Louis Wrestling Hall of Fame
Class of 2019
Ultimate Championship Wrestling
UCW Women's Championship (1 time)
United States Wrestling Association
USWA Women's Championship (2 times)
World Wrestling Alliance
WWA Women's Championship (1 time)
Other titles
AAWF Ladies' Championship (1 time)
SSWF Women's Championship (1 time)
WWWA Women's Championship (1 time)

References

External links
Debbie Combs at Cagematch.net
Debbie Combs = Big Star! at FCI Women's Wrestling
Professional wrestling record for Debbie Combs from The Internet Wrestling Database

1959 births
Living people
American female professional wrestlers
Professional wrestlers from Kentucky
Professional Wrestling Hall of Fame and Museum
Sportswomen from Kentucky
Stampede Wrestling alumni
21st-century American women
20th-century professional wrestlers
NWA World Women's Champions